Viviers-du-Lac (literally Viviers of the Lake) is a commune in the Savoie department in the Auvergne-Rhône-Alpes region in south-eastern France. It is part of the urban area of Chambéry. When Air Alpes existed, its head office was in the Chambéry Airport in the commune.

See also

Communes of the Savoie department

References

External links

Official site

Communes of Savoie